is an opera in three acts by Riccardo Zandonai to an Italian libretto by Cesare Hanau based on The Cricket on the Hearth by Charles Dickens. It premiered on 28 November 1908 at the Teatro Politeama Chiarella in Turin (Politeama Chiarella di Torino).

History
Dickens' popular novella was the basis for several operas, including Giuseppe Gallignani's  Il grillo del focolare which premiered in Genoa in 1873, Karl Goldmark's  (libretto by A. M. Willner) which premiered in Berlin (1896) and New York (1910), and a setting by English composer Alexander Mackenzie (president of the Royal Academy of Music) which was composed to a libretto by Julian Sturgis in 1900. All of these predated Zandonai's setting, which helped bring him to the attention of publisher Giulio Ricordi. Following success in Torino, Zandonai's opera had successful performances in Nice and Genoa. It has received occasional performances in Europe throughout the century and a live performance with the Orchestra filarmonica "G. Rossini" di Pesaro conducted by Ottavio Ziino (presented by Città di Osimo, Festival Opera lirica) was broadcast by RAI in 1986 and was made available on DVD by House of Opera.  The North American premiere was given in a concert version by Teatro Grattacielo in October 2017, conducted by Israel Gursky.

Roles

References

External links
 
 

Operas
Italian-language operas
Operas by Riccardo Zandonai
1906 operas
Adaptations of works by Charles Dickens
Operas based on novels